Aaradimanninte Janmi is a 1972 Indian Malayalam-language film, directed and produced by P. Bhaskaran. The film stars Prem Nazir, Madhu, Sheela and Jayabharathi. The musical score is by R. K. Shekhar. It is a remake of the Tamil film Neerkumizhi.

Cast 

Prem Nazir as K. Sethumadhavan Nair
Madhu as Prasad
Sheela as Dr. Jayanthi
Jayabharathi as Sumathi
Adoor Bhasi as Philipose Muthalaali
Jose Prakash as Dr. Menon
Sankaradi as Storekeeper Shankara Kurup
Sujatha as Nurse Nirmala
T. K. Balachandran as Murali
Prema as Nurse Marikkutty
Baby Shobha as Mini
Paul Vengola as Peon Ramu
Aravindakshan as D'Cruz
Bahadoor as Ouseppu Chettan
Philomina as Vishalakshi Amma
C. A. Balan as Avaran
Ramankutty Menon as Old Man
Pala Thankam as Murali's Mother

Soundtrack 
The music was composed by R. K. Shekhar and the lyrics were written by P. Bhaskaran and Sreekumaran Thampi.

References

External links 
 

1972 films
1970s Malayalam-language films
Films with screenplays by K. Balachander
Malayalam remakes of Tamil films
Films directed by P. Bhaskaran